Douglas Stewart Fraser (7 December 1886 – 24 February 1919) was an Australian rules footballer who played for Carlton in the Victorian Football League (VFL).

A Yarraville Football Club premiership player in the Victorian Football Association (VFA), Fraser broke into a strong Carlton team in the 1910 VFL season and established a place in the side as a follower. He kicked three goals in a win over Geelong at Princes Park.

Fraser is best remembered for his involvement in the bribery scandal that hit the league during the 1910 finals series. Together with Doug Gillespie and his childhood friend Alex Lang, Fraser was withdrawn from the Semi Final against South Melbourne while Carlton and the league investigated allegations that they had accepted bribes to 'play dead'. Lang and Fraser were both found guilty and suspended for five years, a total of 99 league games.

He died in 1919 from influenza, having never played senior football again.

References

Sources

 Atkinson, G. (1982) Everything you ever wanted to know about Australian rules football but couldn't be bothered asking, The Five Mile Press: Melbourne. .

Holmesby, Russell and Main, Jim (2007). The Encyclopedia of AFL Footballers. 7th ed. Melbourne: Bas Publishing.
Profile on Blueseum.org

1886 births
Carlton Football Club players
Subiaco Football Club players
Yarraville Football Club players
Australian rules footballers from Melbourne
Deaths from Spanish flu
1919 deaths
Infectious disease deaths in Victoria (Australia)
People from Brunswick, Victoria
Australian people of Scottish descent